Wallace Harcourt Fraser was an Australian politician.

In 1961 he was elected to the Tasmanian House of Assembly as a Labor member for Bass in a recount following Reg Turnbull's resignation to contest the Senate. He was defeated in 1969.

References

Year of birth missing
Year of death missing
Members of the Tasmanian House of Assembly
Australian Labor Party members of the Parliament of Tasmania